Oscar Román Rosas González (born 14 September 1968) is a Mexican politician affiliated with the PRI. He served as a Senator in the LXII Legislature of the Mexican Congress and a federal deputy in the LXI Legislature. He was elected the municipal president of Ciudad del Carmen in 2018.

References

http://www.carmen.gob.mx/home/entrega-alcalde-oscar-rosas-premio-municipal-de-emprendedor-carmelita-2021/

1968 births
Living people
Politicians from Ciudad del Carmen
Institutional Revolutionary Party politicians
Members of the Chamber of Deputies (Mexico)
Members of the Senate of the Republic (Mexico)
21st-century Mexican politicians
Autonomous University of Carmen alumni
Members of the Congress of Campeche